"Blame It on Me" is a song by British singer-songwriter George Ezra. It was released as the fourth single from his debut studio album, Wanted on Voyage (2014). The song was released in the United Kingdom as a digital download on 11 August 2014 through Columbia Records. It debuted at number 6 on the UK Singles Chart, marking Ezra's second consecutive top 10 hit.

Background
Ezra explained the song to InStyle. "I wrote it when I was 18 and had just moved to Bristol. I was saddled with student loans, and I realised there were so many opportunities to play music, so unless I got busy, I could only blame myself."

Music video
An official lyric video to accompany the release of "Blame It on Me" was issued on 20 June 2014, with Ezra holding an old-fashioned TV with the lyrics appearing on it; at the same time, he is sitting on the seat of a dunk tank while several tennis balls are thrown towards it from off-screen. At the end of the bridge, a ball hits the button and Ezra falls into the water. He then holds the TV above his head for a while, whilst his face is barely visible. As the song ends, tennis balls are thrown towards the TV, which finally falls out of Ezra's hands and into the water. The video then ends with him laughing.

The official music video was directed by Rob Brandon. It was first released onto YouTube on 12 August 2014 at a total length of three minutes and forty-four seconds. The video begins with a Ford pickup full of criminals driving past Ezra, who is carrying his guitar in its case, and a Japanese man. The man asks Ezra in Japanese, "Are you sure you want to follow the yellow brick road?" and then walks away without Ezra giving a response. The rest of the video features Ezra having a very bad day, including his guitar case blowing open and the instrument falling out into the road before being run over by a police car; getting tackled by a rugby team; hit with a sucker dart fired from a toy pistol by a child, defecated on by a bird and winding up in the middle of a gunfight between police officers and the aforementioned criminals. As some signs from the industrial estate featuring on the video reveal, the video was shot in the Bellvitge area of L'Hospitalet de Llobregat near Barcelona and in the Poblenou district of the Catalan capital. The video has over 66 million views as of August 2022.

Track listing

Charts

Weekly charts

Year-end charts

Certifications

Release history

References

2014 singles
2014 songs
George Ezra songs
Columbia Records singles
Songs written by Joel Pott
Songs written by George Ezra
Song recordings produced by Cam Blackwood